Leonard Harris (September 27, 1929 – August 28, 2011) was an American actor, critic and author. Despite his short acting career, he is well-known for his roles as Senator Charles Palantine in Taxi Driver (1976) and the mayor in Hero at Large (1980).

Biography
Leonard Jerome Harris was born in the Bronx on Sept. 27, 1929. He graduated from City College and served in the Army at Fort Dix during the Korean War. In 1961 he married Mary Ann Wurth. They had two children: Sarah and David Harris. They divorced in 1973. He also had homes in Stanfordville, N.Y., and West Palm Beach, Fla.

Mr. Harris began his career writing obituaries and book reviews for the Hartford Courant in 1958. In 1966 he became a culture critic at WCBS-TV in New York City, a position he held until 1974. He had three novels published and worked as a television writer later in his career. He served on the Tony Award Nominating Committee in the later 1980s and early 1990s.

Mr. Harris also played the mayor in a 1980 romantic comedy, Hero at Large. His first novel, The Masada Plan, was called "gripping, fast-moving, expertly engineered" by the novelist Meyer Levin in The New York Times Book Review. A fourth novel was published posthumously.

He died on August 28, 2011, in Hartford, Connecticut, aged 81, from complications of pneumonia.

Filmography

Film

Television

Bibliography

References

External links
 
 William Goldman's comments on Harris' role as theater critic

1929 births
2011 deaths
American theater critics
American male film actors
City College of New York alumni
United States Army personnel of the Korean War
Deaths from pneumonia in Connecticut
Male actors from New York City
People from the Bronx
Journalists from New York City